The 2022 Millers Oils Ginetta GT4 Supercup is a multi-event, one make GT motor racing championship held across England and Scotland. The championship features a mix of professional motor racing teams and privately funded drivers, competing in Ginetta G55s that conform to the technical regulations for the championship. It forms part of the extensive program of support categories built up around the BTCC centrepiece. The 2022 season began on 14 May at Brands Hatch, and will end on 9 October, at the same track, with races broadcast on ITV and ITV4 throughout the season.

Teams and drivers
2022 was the first year of the new Ginetta G56, with the field running a mixture of G56s and the previous G55s.

Race calendar and results

Championship standings

Notes
A driver's best 22 scores counted towards the championship, with any other points being discarded.

Drivers' championships

Notes

References

External links
 
 Ginetta GT4 Supercup Series News
Ginetta GT4 Supercup
Ginetta GT4 Supercup seasons